Private Yuk Objects is a 1966 Australian play about the Vietnam War. It is allegedly the first play in the world on that topic.

References

External links
Private Yuk Objects at AusStage

Australian plays
1966 plays
Vietnam War fiction